The Twinkle Brothers are a Jamaican reggae band formed in 1962, and still active in the 21st century under Norman Grant's lead.

History
The Twinkle Brothers were formed in 1962 by brothers Norman (vocals, drums) and Ralston Grant (vocals, rhythm guitar) from Falmouth, Jamaica. The band was expanded with the addition of Eric Barnard (piano), Karl Hyatt (vocals, percussion), and Albert Green (congas, percussion).

After winning local talent competitions, they recorded their first single, "Somebody Please Help Me," in 1966 for producer Leslie Kong. This was followed by sessions for other top Jamaican producers such as Duke Reid, Lee "Scratch" Perry, Sid Bucknor, Phil Pratt, and Bunny Lee. The band worked in the late 1960s and early 1970s on the island's hotel circuit, playing a mixture of calypso, soul, pop, and soft reggae, and in the early 1970s, they began producing their own recordings. Their debut album, Rasta Pon Top, was released in 1975, featuring strongly-Rastafari-oriented songs such as "Give Rasta Praise" and "Beat Them Jah Jah".

As well as producing Twinkle Brothers work, Norman Grant also produced other artists since the mid-1970s, including several albums by E.T. Webster. In 1977, the band were signed to Virgin Records' Frontline label, leading to the release of the Love, Praise Jah, and Countrymen albums. When the band were dropped by Virgin Records in the early 1980s, Norman Grant moved to the United Kingdom, and carried on effectively as a solo artist, but still using the Twinkle Brothers name, and continued with regular releases well into the 2000s, mainly on his own Twinkle label.

Since the early 1990s Twinkle Brothers have been regularly collaborating with the Polish band Trebunie-Tutki in which they fuse reggae and traditional music from the Tatra Mountains. An analysis of this collaboration can be found in the popular world music textbook, Worlds of Music and in more detail in the musical ethnography Making Music in the Polish Tatras.

Currently lead by founding member Norman Grant - as well as legendary bass player Dub Judah, Black Steel & Jerry Lions on guitar, Aron Shamash on the keyboards, Barry Prince on drums, and their engineer Derek "Demondo" Fevrier - the Twinkle Brothers are widely considered to be one of the best live foundation reggae bands in circulation, and they continue to play regularly all over the world to a loyal fanbase.

Albums
Rasta Pon Top (1975) Grounation
Love (1977) Front Line
Praise Jah (1979) Front Line
Countrymen (1980) Front Line
Me No You (1981) Twinkle
Underground (1982) Twinkle
Dub Massacre part 1 (1982) Twinkle
Burden Bearer (1983) Twinkle
Enter Zion (1983) Twinkle
Crucial Cuts (1983) Virgin
Dub Massacre Part 2 (1983) Twinkle
Live From Reggae Sunsplash (1984) Twinkle
Right Way (1985)
Kilimanjaro (1985) Twinkle
Anti-Apartheid (1985) Twinkle
Dub Massacre Part 3 (1985) Twinkle
Respect and Honour (1987) Twinkle
Twinkle Love Songs (1987) Twinkle
All The Hits From 1970-88 (1988) Twinkle
New Songs For Jah (1989) Twinkle
Rastafari Chant (1989) Twinkle
Dub Massacre Part 4 (1989) Twinkle
All Is Well (1990) Twinkle
Free Africa (1990) Front Line
Live In Warsaw (1990) Twinkle
Unification (1990) Twinkle
Wind of Change (1990) Twinkle
Dub Massacre Part 5 - Lion Head (1990) Twinkle
Old Cuts (1991)
Don't Forget Africa (1992) Twinkle
Twinkle Love Songs volume 2 (1992) Twinkle
Dub With Strings (1992) Twinkle
Babylon Rise Again (1992) Twinkle
Higher Heights (1992) Twinkle Music (with Polish folk band Trebunie-Tutki)
Comeback Twinkle 2 (1994) Ryszard (with Polish folk band Trebunie-Tutki)
Dub Massacre Part 6 - Dub Feeding Program (1994) Twinkle
Chant Down Babylon (1995) Twinkle
Dub Plate (1995) Twinkle
Dub Salute Part 5 (1996) Jah Shaka
Final Call (1997) Twinkle
Greatest Hits (1997) Kahamuk (with Trebunie Tutki)
Twinkle Love Songs, Vol. 3; Heart to Heart (2000) Twinkle
Live At Maritime Hall: San Francisco (2001) 2B1
Old Time Something (2002) Twinkle
Will This World Survive (2002) Twinkle
Give The Sufferer A Chance (2004) Twinkle
The Youthful Warrior (2004) Twinkle
Songs of Glory/Pieśni chwały (Warsaw 2008) - (with Trebunie Tutki)
Repent (2008), Sip a Cup
Praises to the King (2009) Reggae on Top
Culture Defender (2011)  Gussie P Music
Gift of Jah (2011) Twinkle
Bribery And Corruption (2012) Twinkle
Bunker Buster (2012)  Twinkle
Glimmer Of Hope (2012)  Twinkle
Do It Again (2019)  Twinkle
Pass It On (2019)  Twinkle

Members
Current members
Norman Grant – Vocals (1962–present)
Ralston Grant – Vocals, Rhythm guitar (1962–present)
Dub Judah – Bass (1990–present)
Black Steel – Guitar (1986–present)
Jerry Lions – Guitar (1987–present)
Derek "Demondo" Fevrier – Engineer (1986–present)
Barry Prince – Drums (2004–present)
Aron Shamash – Keyboards (2004–present)

References

External links
Discography
Interview on Reggae Vibes
 https://soundcloud.com/adry-itus/rasta-pon-top-bass-itus-rmx

Jamaican reggae musical groups
Musical groups established in 1962
1962 establishments in Jamaica
Roots Reggae Library